Kabhi Pyar Na Karna is a Pakistani Urdu film directed by Javed Raza. The film was produced by Khawaja Tariq Tahir and it is written by Ahmed Aqeel Ruby.  Zara Sheikh, Veena Malik and Moammar Rana perform leading roles in this film. Bollywood actress Neha Dhupia made her Pakistani film debut.  Kabhi Pyar Na Karna was distributed by Eveready Pictures and was released on 18 April 2008.

Cast 
 Zara Sheikh
 Moammar Rana
 Neha Dhupia
 Veena Malik
 Shamyl Khan
  Naghma

Production 
The film was shot in the United States and Pakistan. Bollywood actress Neha Dhupia made her Pakistani film debut

Release 
The film was released nationwide on 18 April 2008.

References

External links

2008 films
2000s Urdu-language films
Pakistani romantic musical films
Films scored by Amjad Bobby
Films scored by Humaira Arshad